KCHO (sometimes spelt "K'cho"), born Alexis Leiva Machado on the Isle of Pines (1970), is a contemporary Cuban artist. He first attracted international attention by winning the grand prize at South Korea's Gwangju Biennale in 1995.

Biography

Early years
Alexis Leiva Machado (Kcho) was born in Nueva Gerona, Isla de la Juventud, on February 12, 1970. Son of Ignacio de Loyola Leiva Abreu, a carpenter and telecommunication technician, and Martina Primitiva Machado Cuní, better known as Martha Camacho, a famous artist, he grew up alongside four other sisters in a hard-working environment. He attended Josué País primary school, Manuel Alcolea primary school, and subsequently, Elementary Art School Leonardo Liberta in Isla de la Juventud. In 1986, he enrolled in the National School of Plastic Arts (ENA) in Havana and graduated in 1990, specializing in painting and sculpture.

In 1986, at sixteen, he marked the start of his career with the personal exhibition "Kcho Expone Favelas" at the Centre of Plastic Arts in Nueva Gerona. From 1990 onwards, he began to display his works in individual and collective exhibitions both nationally and internationally. One of his works from his graduation thesis Paisaje Popular Cubano, 1990 (Cuban Popular Landscape), homonymously named, allowed him to be part of the permanent collection displayed at the Fine Arts Museum of Cuba (MNBA).

1990s
In 1991, KCHO made his first personal exhibition at the MNBA for the "Artist of the Month" space, which around that time received exhibitions from great exponents of Cuban plastic arts. That same year he was awarded the Prize granted by the National Group of Art Schools' Teachers at the Centre of Plastic Arts and Design of Havana, Cuba. Also in 1991, he was part of the exhibition Proyectos Recientes (Recent Projects) with the sculptors Alejandro Aguilera, Ángel Ricardo Ríos, and Osvaldo Yero, among others, at the Arts Centre 23 y 12 in Havana.

He took part in the travelling show Los Hijos de Guillermo Tell (The Sons of William Tell) by curator Gerardo Mosquera, which was displayed at the Museum Alejandro Otero in Caracas, Venezuela and the Library Luis Ángel Arango in Bogotá Colombia. It gathered artists like José Bedía, Glexis Novoa, and other important representatives of the 80's generation –Kcho being the youngest artist invited to the exhibition. This show was given a warm and favourable reception by both the public and the specialized critics, including the article written by Ivonne Pine that appeared in the second edition of the ArtNexus magazine under the same title as the exhibition.

1992 was significant for the arts in Cuba since it enhanced the view of strength and creativity held by the plastic arts in this country. It was marked by two crucial international collective exhibitions in which Kcho had the opportunity to display his work: Vont Dort Aus: Kuba, organized at the Forum Ludwig in Aachen, Germany, and Arte Cubano Actual (Current Cuban Art) coordinated by Robert Littman for the Cultural Centre of Contemporary Art from the Cultural Foundation Televisa in Mexico City. He took part as well in critical international projects such as the First Biennial Barro de América (Clay of America) by curator and critic Roberto Guevara at the Museum of Contemporary Art Sofía Imber in Caracas, Venezuela, where he shared exhibition spaces with Ana Mendieta (1948 – 1985), Rimel Cardillo, Milton Becerra and other essential artists in the region. Other favourable occasions to broaden the perspective of Cuban art, and Kcho's view, in particular, was the collective exhibitions La Década Prodigiosa (The Prodigious Decade), which grouped a selection of Cuban plastic arts from the eighties at the Museo Universitario del Chopo in Mexico City, and La Ronda Cubana (The Cuban Round) at the Van Reekum Museum in Apeldoorn, Holland.

In 1993, Kcho fulfilled an extensive agenda of national and international commitments exhibiting his works in Cuba, the United States, Mexico, and Holland, among other countries.

In 1994, he won a scholarship to the Ludwig Foundation for art studies in Aachen, Germany, and he also got invitations to three critical events in the art circuit. The first one came from curator Nelson Aguilar to participate in the 22nd Biennial in São Paulo, Brazil; the second one from Dan Cameron to be part of the collective exhibition Cocido y Crudo (Cooked and Raw) organized at the Museum Reina Sofia in Madrid; and the third invitation came from Yiliam Yanes Godoy, curator and director of the first and significant Biennials of Havana, to become part of the exhibition La Otra Orilla (The Other Shore) during the Fifth Biennial of Havana held at the colonial fortress Castillo de Los Tres Reyes del Morro –in this last event, he displayed his work La Regata which from that very same year belongs to the collection of the Ludwig Museum in Cologne, Germany. La Regata appears on the cover of Revolución y Cultura magazine (issue No. 5, 1994) and in Artnews, June 2000.

In 1995, he participated in the 1st Kwang-Ju Biennial, Korea, where his work won the Grand Prix. That same year, in Paris, France, he was awarded the Prize for the Promotion of Arts granted by UNESCO due to the magnitude and scope of his work, for which Prize an international jury must select from hundreds of applicants worldwide. The award was presented by the then Director of UNESCO, Federico Mayor Zaragoza.

Also in 1995, he made three personal exhibitions: Kcho at the Pilar I Joan Miró Foundation in Majorca, Spain; El Camino de la nostalgia (The road of nostalgia) at Centre Wifredo Lam in Havana; and Tabla de salvación (Salvation) at the Espacio Abierto Gallery, also in Havana, Cuba. In these three shows, the artist reinforces his interest in the subject of travels and migrations with simple but categorical installations such as El Camino de la nostalgia and Lo Mejor del Verano (The Best Part of Summer) –the latter being also displayed at the exhibition Cocido y Crudo organized by the Museum Reina Sofía in Spain.

Kcho represented Cuba in critical collective exhibitions like Arte nuevo de Cuba (New Art from Cuba) at the Whitechapel Art Gallery in London, Great Britain, by curator Katherine Lampert; Campo (Countryside) by curator Francesco Bonami, for the opening of the Sandretto-Re Rebaudengo Foundation for the Arts, in Turin, Italy – this show was also displayed at the exhibition halls of the same Foundation in Venice, Italy; Nuestro Siglo (Our Century) at the Ludwig Museum in Cologne, Germany; Diálogos de Paz (Peace Dialogues) at the United Nations Headquarters, Geneva, Switzerland; La Habana – São Paulo – which grouped a sample of biennials from Cuba and Brazil, at the Centre for Cultures of the World, in Berlin, Germany; at the 1st Biennial of Johannesburg, South Africa; and at the 4th International Biennial of Istanbul, Turkey. By the end of the year 1995, Kcho had met Barbara Gladstone, owner of the Barbara Gladstone Gallery in New York, in Havana, with whom he organized two significant exhibitions that helped develop a greater awareness of his work in the United States and the rest of the world.

In 1996, during the first of these shows, which were named Kcho, the Museum of Modern Art (MOMA) in New York acquired his work Columna Infinita # 1 (Infinite Column # 1), which along with the previously received drawing A Los Ojos de la history (In the Eyes of History), 1995, represent him at the permanent collection of this museum. Kcho became the artist who reopened MOMA's doors to Cuban art, being, after Wifredo Lam, the first to be part of such a unique collection.

In 1996, the Cuban artist displayed his work at the Studio Guenzani in Italy and extended an invitation to the young Italian artist Giuseppe Gabellone. He also showed the exhibition Para olvidar (To Forget) at the International Center of Contemporary Art in Montreal, Canada.

The same year, Kcho's work went to Europe as part of the exhibition about the history of Cuban art: Cuba Siglo XX. Modernidad y sincretismo (Cuba the 20th Century. Modernity and Syncretism). It travelled from the Centro Atlántico de Arte Moderno in Las Palmas de Gran Canaria, Spain, through La Caixa, Palma de Mallorca, Spain; the Centre d'Arte Santa Mónica, Barcelona; and the Kunsthalle Bielefeld in Germany.

The installation Obras escogidas (Selected Works) appeared on the cover of Flash Art magazine, May/June issue, 1996. After being invited by curator Jan Hoet, Kcho visits Belgium to participate in the show De Rode Poort at the Museum van Hedendaagse Kunst in Ghent. He also takes part in the exhibition Arte a través de Los océanos (Art through the Oceans) at Container 96 in Copenhagen.

1997 was a year with plenty of work and personal and collective exhibitions. At that time, he had the opportunity to work with Chief Curator Paul Schimmel and Assistant Curator, Alma Ruiz, to organize his intimate show Todo cambia (Everything Changes) for the Museum of Contemporary Art (MOCA) in Los Angeles, California. KCHO could not go to the opening himself because the government of the United States refused his entry visa.

Yet this ban on setting foot on American soil stopped neither this exhibition at MOCA nor the private show: Kcho, Proyectos recientes (Kcho, Recent Projects) at the Regen Projects Gallery in Los Angeles, nor the collective exhibitions No Place Like Home at the Walker Art Center in Minneapolis by curator Richard Flood and TRUCE: Ecos del Arte en la Edad de las conclusiones infinitas (TRUCE: Echoes of art at the age of infinite conclusions), by curator Francesco Bonami, in Santa Fe, United States.

Other noteworthy exhibitions in 1997 were his show "Speaking of the Obvious Was Never a Pleasure for Us" at the Israel Museum, Billy Rose Pavilion, in Jerusalem, and the collective exhibitions: Utopian Territories, New Art from Cuba at the Morris and Helen Belkin Art Gallery, University of British Columbia and at the Contemporary Art Gallery, both in Vancouver, Canada; Trash at the Museo d'Arte Moderna e Contemporanea di Trento e Rovereto, Italy; Así está la Cosa: instalación y arte objeto en América Latina (That's How Things Are: installations and Object Art in Latin America), an international exhibition of modern art organized at the Cultural Centre of Contemporary Art in Mexico; and the 6th Biennial of Havana, that took place at the colonial fortress San Carlos de La Cabaña, for which he created the exhibit Archipiélago de mi pensamiento (Archipelago in My Mind) from the series Columna infinita (Infinite Column) –currently this piece belongs to a private collection in Italy.

In 1998, just as in previous years, Kcho took part in the most important art exhibitions and biennials all over the world, such as Arco in Madrid; Dark Art in Senegal; the 3rd Biennial Barro de América and the Feria Iberoamericana de Arte in Venezuela; Cada día (Every Day), 11th Biennial in Sydney, Australia; and Expoarte in Guadalajara, Mexico. His work is in the following collective shows: Visión global del nuevo Arte de Los Noventa (Global View of the New Art of the Nineties) in Deste Foundation in Athens, Greece, and +Zone, at Palazzo Re Rebaudengo in Guarene d'Alba, Italy.

This same year the most outstanding personal exhibitions were Archipiélago de mi pensamiento, Serie Americana, I Kcho, at the Galerie Nationale du Jeu De Paume, Paris, France, by curator Daniel Abadie; and Largo Viaje (Long Journey), opened at the GAN Gallery in Tokyo, Japan.

Later, in 1999, Kcho was admitted into the Atelier Calder Residence in Saché, France, after receiving the prize granted by the Calder Foundation and the Ministry of Culture of France. This award made it possible for him to live and work at the Calder studio with a subvention for producing and promoting artworks among the essential art circuits in Europe. Kcho ended his stay in France with the personal exhibition Klder. C.C.C in Tours and with the inclusion of the piece Para olvidar el miedo (To Forget the Fear) in the historic collective exhibition – which attempted to sum up the sculpture in the 20th century - Los Campos de la escultura (Fields of Sculpture), located at the Elysian Fields in Paris.

In 1999, his work travelled with curator Francesco Bonami to the United States for a two-artist exhibition: Encuentros: Kcho and Nauman (Encounters: Kcho and Nauman), at the Museum of Contemporary Art in Chicago.

2000s
Kcho had three outstanding exhibitions during the year 2000. The first one took place in Cuba. It was titled No me agradezcan el silencio (Don't Thank Me for the Silence) and displayed at Casa de las Américas in Havana. This display allowed him to show how his ideas and projects have evolved after some time without exhibiting in his own country. Very soon after, another show was opened, this time in Madrid, Spain: La columna infinita (The Infinite Column) at the National Museum Reina Sofia. And finally, in the United States of America, the exhibition Kcho. Dibujos (Kcho. Drawings) turned out to be his last to date at the Barbara Gladstone Gallery since the impossibility of travelling to the United States made it very hard to meet the established obligations and to keep actual relations with this vital gallery in New York.

During his career, Kcho has kept up to date with all engraving techniques. This passion made him create or restore a series of Engraving Workshops all along Cuba, which facilitated the creative work of artists and students specialized in this branch of the plastic arts in the country.

In the year 2001, he displayed "25 Piedras" (25 Stones), a personal exhibition of lithographs at Taller Experimental de Gráfica (Graph Experimental Workshop) in Havana, Cuba; Diez Grabadores Cubanos (Ten Cuban Engravers) at the Fundación Provincial de Artes Plásticas Rafael Botí (Provincial Foundation of Plastic Arts Rafael Botí), Spain. For the first time, he took a personal exhibition to Isla de la Juventud, specifically to the Martha Machado Gallery, titled "En el mar no hay nada escrito" (There Is Nothing Written on the Sea). Kcho deems this show as a homecoming to share with his fellow countrymen the progress made in his artistic life. There, he built the pieces for the installation La Jungla (Jungle) and exhibited part of this work before embarking on its journey.

In 2001, Kcho exhibited for the second time at the National Museum of Fine Arts in Havana, Cuba, with his work La Jungla. Then he participated in the exhibitions: Contemporary Art in Cuba: Irony and Survival in the Island of Utopia organized by the Spencer Museum of Art of the University of Kansas, USA; Estructuras Similares a Los Ojos de la Historia (Similar Structures in the Eyes of History) at the Tent Centrum Belldende Kunst in Rotterdam, Holland; the 1st Biennial in Valencia, Spain, by curator Aquiles Bonito Oliva; Arco 2001 in Madrid, Spain; and together with artist Kenji Yanobe, he exhibited Para Olvidar at the Shiseido Gallery in Tokyo, Japan.

Kcho was part of the travelling portfolio Suite Europa 2001, carried out by the Dirección General de la Secretaría de Estado para la Cooperación Internacional y para Iberoamérica (General Management of the State Department for International Cooperation and Latin America) organized by the Ministry of Foreign Affairs in Madrid, Spain. Moreover, in 2001, he received the Prize for Cuban Delivery at the 4th Caribbean Biennial at the Museum of Modern Art in Santo Domingo, Dominican Republic.

All personal and collective exhibitions in 2002 were favourable occasions for the artist to reinforce his career and the development of his work by making his new installations, engravings and drawings are known worldwide. The national and international press echoed his achievements when articles appeared in La Rivista del Libri in Italy, Granma newspaper in Cuba under the headline Expectativas for Kcho en Brasil (Expectations by Kcho in Brazil); Flash Art in Italy, preceded by the title La Jungla di Kcho; and ArtNexus, issue 42, to quote a few examples.

Among the private shows stand out La Jungla, exhibited at the Civic Gallery of Modern and Contemporary Art in Turin, Italy; Los peligros del Olvido (Perils of Oblivion) at Gabriela Mistral Gallery in Santiago de Chile; El Huracán (Hurricane) at the Museum of Sculpture in São Paulo, Brazil; the exhibition Artíssima 2002, organized by the Joan Guaita Art Gallery, in Palma de Mallorca, Spain; and Kcho, el Hijo de Martha (Kcho, Son of Martha) at the José Martí Memorial in Havana, Cuba, which opening was attended by Commander in Chief Fidel Castro Ruz.

The most significant collective exhibitions were: Islas imaginaries (Imaginary Islands) that took place at the Museum of Contemporary Art in Zulia, Maracaibo, Venezuela, and again in the travelling portfolio Suite Europa 2001, carried out by the Dirección General de la Secretaría de Estado para la Cooperación Internacional y para Iberoamérica, Spain.

In 2003, the artist collaborated with Cuban singer-songwriter Santiago Feliú using the work Para olvidar as scenery for his concert at the National Theater of Cuba. He began travelling to Venezuela and made his first exhibition, Archipiélago (Archipelago), at the Juan Ruiz Gallery in Maracaibo, Venezuela.

He returned to Havana and opened the doors of his studio to show the work Archipiélago to artists and guests for the 8th Biennial in Havana, held at the Cuban capital then and where he also shared with the audience the performance Pocas Palabras (Few Words). In 2003 Kcho kept being part of the most important exhibitions and biennials worldwide, such as Arco, Madrid, Art Miami and Basel in Chicago.

Works by his authorship were part of the lots at the auctions of Latin American Art of Christie and Sotheby's. In 2004, he participated at the Art Fair in Chicago, USA, invited by Galería Habana de Cuba, with a personal project called La conversación (Conversation). In the Cuban capital, he exhibits part of his installation Núcleos del Tiempo (Time Nucleuses) at the Villa Manuela Gallery –the venue of the Unión de Escritores y Artistas de Cuba, UNEAC (Association of Writers and Artists of Cuba).

Once more, his work is part of important exhibitions in Europe and the United States, for instance: La Jungla, Openasia 2004, in Venice; Obra gráfica original. Artistas contemporáneos Internacionales (Original Graphic Work. International Contemporary Artists) at Miami Beach; as part of the collection MOMA at the Museo del Barrio: Latin American and Caribbean Art, put together by the Museo del Barrio in New York; Art Miami 2004; the Fair of the Americas in Miami, among others.

In 2005, he continued to present his work in galleries and museums in Venezuela, Colombia and Spain. He makes the piece Autorretrato (Self-portrait) for the Fair Arco, in Madrid, with the Joan Guaita Gallery. He is part of the essential collective exhibition Nueve pintores contemporáneos Cubanos (Nine Cuban Contemporary Painters) put on at the Exhibition Hall of the Quay Anthony I in the Principality of Monaco. Other personal exhibitions are Kcho, viajero inmóvil (Kcho, Still Traveller) at the Louis Carré Gallery in Paris, France, by curator Daniel Abadie; Kcho, un hombre de isla (Kcho, an islander) in Houston, Texas; Los animales (Animals) in Galería Habana, Cuba; and Kcho – Casa 5 – Las playas infinitas (Kcho – House 5 – Infinite Beaches), Atteresse Kusnt, in Salzburg, Austria.

During this period, he started working for a longer time in Cuba, not only in Havana but also in Isla de la Juventud and Matanzas. In 2006, he moved to Barcelona for several months to work in a group of choreographies at the workshops of Poligrafa, Spain. There he prepares the exhibition Paso de Los Vientos (Windward Passage), shown later at the Joan Prats Gallery in Barcelona. Besides, there was also the show La nave de Kcho (Kcho's Ship) for the Castillo de Santa Bárbara (Castle of Saint Barbara) in the Patronato Municipal de Alicante by curator Pablo Rico from the Joan Miró Foundation. He returns to Cuba to make his popular work-installation-performance Vive y Deja Vivir (Live and Let Live) for the 9th Biennial of Havana at the Plaza Vieja and in La Casona Gallery.

In the same year, 2006, Kcho went to Colombia, invited by the ex-president and art collector Cesar Gaviria for the exhibition Llegó el Cubano (The Cuban Has Arrived) at the Alonso Garcés Gallery in Bogotá. He also participated in the collective exhibitions Art Miami 2006 in the USA, Arco 2006 in Madrid and the Louis Carré et. Cie. Gallery in Paris, France. At the invitation of the Marlborough Gallery, he goes to Madrid for the opening of the Chilean artist Claudio Bravo. Once there, he is proposed to be part of the select list of artists that exhibit at this renowned gallery and its venues in the essential art capitals of Montecarlo, Santiago de Chile, Barcelona, Madrid, New York and London. This contract constitutes a far-reaching step for the promotion of his work.

In 2007 he made his first personal exhibition with Marlborough Gallery called Retrasando lo inevitable (Delaying the Inevitable) at its venue in Madrid, Spain; he also participated in other critical collective exhibitions organized by this institution, such as Exhibición de Verano (Summer Exhibition) at the venues in Madrid and New York, as well as in the collections shown that year at the fair Arco in Madrid and Art Miami. Other critical personal exhibitions this year were organized at the Museum of Contemporary Art in Panama, under the title El Viaje (Journey) and at the Juan Ruiz Gallery in Maracaibo, Venezuela, called El Cuadernos del hombre de Los pies de Barro (Notebook of the Man with Mud Feet).

Also, in 2007 stands out I participated in the collective exhibitions: Cuba Avant-Garde: Contemporary Cuban Art from the Farber Collection at the University of Florida; Homing Devices at the Museum of Contemporary Art at the University of South Florida, both in the USA; and Ojos de Mar (Sea Eyes) at the Institute of Modern Art in Valencia, Spain. Once more, he is part of the lots at the Latin American auctions by Sotheby's and Christie in New York, USA. He was part of the 1st Biennial Fin del Mundo (End of the World) in Ushuaia, Argentina, with the installation Señores de la playa (Beach Lords) by curator Leonor Amarante.

In 2008, he participated in a considerable number of national and international exhibitions such as Cartografías de Ultramar (Cartographies from Overseas) at the National Museum of Fine Arts in Havana, Cuba; El Futuro del futurismo (The Future of Futurism) at the Gallery of Modern and Contemporary Art in Bergamo, Italy; and the Auction No. 156 of Latin American Art organized at the Palace Hotel in Madrid, Spain.

His work is also part of several shows in the United States, like ¡Cuba! Los Artistas experimental en su país (Cuba! Artists Experiment in Their Country) at the Hunterdon Art Museum in New Jersey; Summer Exhibition and Latin American Art organized by the Marlborough Gallery in New York; Visiones, Centuria de Arte Latinoamericano (Visions, a Century of Latin American Art) at the Art Museum Boca Ratón in Florida; Sin ruptures: Diálogos en el Arte Cubano (No Ruptures: Dialogues in Cuban Art) at the Art Museum in Fort Lauderdale; NeoHooDoo: Art for a Forgotten Faith in Houston, Texas; and A Wake-up Call: Cuban Contemporary Art at Tresart, Coral Gables, Florida.

In February 2008, he organized a project with the Marlborough Gallery in New York called Cadena de reunificación familiar (Family Reunification Chain). Here Kcho defines new ways of approaching the migration subject, which is fundamental in the artist's work. Magazine ArtNexus No. 69 echoes this exhibition with the article Kcho. Marlborough Gallery by critic and journalist Alberto Barral.

On June 3 of this year, Kcho donated his private collection of Cuban art to the Museo Municipal de la Isla de la Juventud, where Kcho Studio built a Cuban Art Exhibition Hall to contribute to the study and knowledge of national painting. The collection amounts to a total of 52 works by fifteen of the most important Cuban artists, among which we can find: Vicente Escobar, Leopoldo Romañanch, Antonio Rodríguez Morey, Eduardo Abela Villareal, Domingo Ramos, Fidelio Ponce de León, Amelia Peláez, Wifredo Lam, Marcelo Pogolotti, Luis Martínez Pedro, René Portocarrero, Mariano Rodríguez, Servando Cabrera, Raúl Martínez, and Antonia Eiriz.

In 2008, Cuba was battered head-on by hurricanes Gustav (August 30, forced four on the Saffir-Simpson scale), Ike (September 9, forcing four) and Paloma (November 8, forced three), all of which severely affected the island and socioeconomic infrastructure.

Isla de la Juventud, the birthplace of artists, suffered the ravages of two of these natural phenomena, Gustav and Ike, so as an immediate response to the urgent human need to restore hope and confidence in the morning entire population, founded on September 6, 2008, the Art Squad "Martha Machado". Kcho, the Brigade managed to score more than 500 artists and renowned friends, both national and international painters, actors, musicians, dancers, circus performers, and stilt walkers, who left their jobs, leaving the comforts of their daily lives to live in tents and selflessly provide the best of his art. The community artists painted workshops, music and dance to encourage creativity and educate children and adolescents as a palliative education for those who could not attend school because the facilities were partially destroyed.

The Brigade worked continuously throughout Cuba, where he installed 13 camps. Kcho bears his study with each of the provinces to visit the Brigade. They continued to work on their drawings, sculptures and installations projects but found that the Brigade formed a collective work of art that continues to grow and to retrieve villages, dreams and hopes.

Experience in Cuba with all the educational work, humanitarian and social, to bring solidarity, culture and joy to the most remote places and people affected psychologically and economically, made it possible for a representation of over 70 Cuban artists of the highest level, members of the brigade "Martha Machado", travelled to the people of Haiti in March 2010 after being hit by a devastating earthquake on January 12, 2010, seriously affecting the Caribbean country's infrastructure. The Brigade travelled over four thousand kilometres from their base in Port-au-Prince to all corners of the country. From the outset, the work of the Brigade placed particular emphasis on children, knowing that they are the most affected and the wounds of the soul are the hardest to heal. These wounds compromise the future of a nation.

Kcho considers this significant inspiration for the benefit provided to recipients of both art and those who offer it. Currently still working on this idea of multiplying Brigade "Martha Machado".

In 2009, he focused his work on issues that most concern: life, man, customs and culture, with particular emphasis on its way and movements.

He received an invitation from Leonor Amarantes to participate in the V Latin American Biennial of Visual Arts in Curitiba, Brazil. For this particular occasion, the artist created a large installation, making the classroom of a school with all their property in a great "Archipelago in motion," this creation becomes part of the Nuclei of Time series, the artist structure by way of a poem where he talks about the journey that the man with knowledge.

March 2009 marked the Tenth Havana Biennial, Cuba, in which said Kcho had broad participation; an example of this was to install "Core Time" in the contemporary Cuban art exhibit that HB remained in the exhibition room Pabexpo B, which also presented their works artists like Luis Gomez, Rene Francisco, Sandra Ramos, The Carpenters, among others.

But without doubt, one of the essential flags in this biennial project proved to be the curatorship Meeting Point organized by Kcho in the Convent of St. Francis of Assisi in Havana, where he includes his work history as a carousel that appears from the darkness.

Kcho met in Havana, as a meeting point, prestigious international contemporary art creators, such as Cai Guo-Qiang (China), Peter Nadin (USA), Patrick Tuttofuoco (Italy), Jane Alexander (South Africa), Tatsuo Miyajima (Japan), AES + F (Russia), Mariana Bunimov (Venezuela), and Patricia Gerber Jallageas Flaminio (Brazil), Shirin Neshat and Shoja Azari (Iran-US), Tomas Sanchez, Edgar Hechavarría, Luis Gomez and Yoan Capote (Cuba).

This exhibition was a significant public acceptance of it was a unique opportunity to learn and appreciate the vital work of these artists, which echoed much of the press and abroad, as the New York Times newspaper in its issue Wednesday, April 1, 2009, entitled Havana Biennial, in Which Chelsea Takes a Field Trip to Cuba.

Another significant group shows this year, for the work of Kcho, was: I have a Dream (I have a dream) at the Carriage House Center for the Arts in New York on art paper. Ten contemporary artists, in Granada, Spain, the Summer Exhibition and the Exhibition of sculptures collectively organized by the Marlborough Gallery in Madrid and New York, respectively, met with a select roster of artists.

2010s
In 2010 the artist received an invitation to participate in the piece's history as a carousel that appears from the darkness at the Biennale Cuvée, OK Center, Linz, Austria, and in various collective exhibitions organized annually by the Marlborough Gallery in headquarters and at international art fairs. Celebrating its 40 years, making the second edition of Live and Let Live in Central Park Line and L, in Havana, Cuba, again, with massive public participation.

In early 2011, he moved to Europe to participate in two solo exhibitions he organized with headquarters in Marlborough, called Recent Works (Oeuvres recentes) in Monaco and Barcelona Night View, while in the old continent formed the works exhibited at the Palace Grimani as part of the 54th Venice Biennale, entitled Monument end, curated by Vittorio Sgarbi and Luciano Caprile, with the collaboration of Tega Gallery.

Back in Cuba, he travelled to the Isla de la Juventud and continued to organize and develop the Isla de la Juventud Days Mine, Cuba, by the Revolution as part of the actions of the brigade "Martha Machado" and took this stay in their homeland for the third edition of his performance-installation-Live and Let Live, this time within the Gallery Martha Machado.

Currently, the artist is working on several projects in Europe and America. But mostly, the sample Sacrifice at the crossroads, ready to open in the coming month of November, gives significant importance because it showed a group of essential works made between 2005 and 2011, summarizing the course of their work by making explicit its concerns about the man, his cultural essences and sorrows.

His short career - until 2011 - more than 90 solo exhibitions and 200 group exhibitions in 35 countries. His work has been exhibited in major museums and galleries worldwide and has hosted major biennial work. Kcho has also been honoured for his work as a social being, as a Cuban who loves his country. Among the most significant awards include the distinction "National Culture" in 1998, awarded by the Ministry of Culture and in 2003 received the Medal "Abel Santamaria" award by the State Council on the proposal of the Young Communists (UJC) and the Replica of the Machete of Maximo Gomez. He delivers the minister of the FAR.

In 2008, he was awarded the Order "Julio Antonio Mella", issued by the State Council, a proposal from the National UJC. As a creator of the brigade "Martha Machado" received in 2008, in conjunction with the other members, the Flag Feat Labor conferred by CTC and the Commemorative Medal for the Bicentennial of the Republic of Haiti in 2010, the artwork and solidarity developed in that sister nation.

He was elected deputy of the Popular Power National Assembly in July 2003 to represent the people of the Isla de la Juventud and was reelected in January 2008. Kcho received in April 2011 the stamp commemorating the Central de Trabajadores de Cuba (CTC) on the 70th anniversary of its founding.

Literature
Alfred Weidinger: KCHO - Casa 5 - Las Playas Infinitas. Edition Anteros, Vienna 2005,

References

Yvon Grenier, Culture and the Cuban State; Participation, Recognition, and Dissonance under Communism (Lexington Books, 2017)

External links

 kchoestudio.com
 artcyclopedia.com
 findarticles.com
 medaid.org
 artnexus.com
 havana-cultura.com

1970 births
Living people
Cuban contemporary artists
People from Nueva Gerona
National Art Schools (Cuba) alumni